Jacob H. Gilbert (June 17, 1920 – February 27, 1981) was an American lawyer and politician who served six terms as a United States representative from New York between 1960 and 1971.

Life
Gilbert was born on June 17, 1920, in the Bronx, New York City. He attended the public schools and graduated from St. John's College and from St. John's University School of Law. He was admitted to the bar in 1944, and practiced law in New York City.

Early political career 
Gilbert was an Assistant Corporation Counsel of New York City from January 1949 to December 1950. He was a member of the New York State Assembly (Bronx Co., 4th D.) from 1951 to 1954, sitting in the 168th and 169th New York State Legislatures. He was a member of the New York State Senate (27th D.) from 1955 to 1960, sitting in the 170th, 171st and 172nd New York State Legislatures.

Congress 
He was elected as a Democrat to the 86th United States Congress, to fill the vacancy caused by the resignation of Isidore Dollinger. He was re-elected to the 87th, 88th, 89th, 90th and 91st United States Congresses, holding office from March 8, 1960, to January 3, 1971.

Later career and death 
Afterwards he resumed the practice of law.

He died on February 27, 1981, in the Bronx; and was buried at the Mount Hebron Cemetery in Flushing, Queens.

See also
 List of Jewish members of the United States Congress

External links
 
 

1920 births
1981 deaths
Jewish members of the United States House of Representatives
Democratic Party New York (state) state senators
Democratic Party members of the New York State Assembly
St. John's University (New York City) alumni
St. John's University School of Law alumni
Democratic Party members of the United States House of Representatives from New York (state)
20th-century American politicians
Politicians from the Bronx
20th-century American Jews